The Caturrita Formation is a rock formation found in Rio Grande do Sul, Brazil. Its sediments were deposited in the Paraná Basin. The formation is from the Upper Triassic and forms part of the Santa Maria Supersequence in the upper section of the Rosário do Sul Group.

Etymology
The formation received this name, because Caturrita is a neighbourhood (barrio) of Santa Maria.

In Portuguese caturrita also refers to the monk parakeet.

Stratigraphy 
The sediments of the Caturrita Formation belong to the second unit of the Santa Maria Supersequence and overlie the Alemoa Member of the Santa Maria Formation. The clayey sediments of the Alemoa Member gradually give way to the more sandy, rarely conglomeratic, Caturrita Formation, which finishes with an unconformity. After this erosional event follow the Rhaetian sediments of the Mata Sandstone, the third unit of the Santa Maria Supersequence.

The Caturrita Formation was once regarded as a member of the stratigraphically higher Botucatu Formation or was expanded to include the Mata Sandstone.

The Caturrita Formation reaches a maximum thickness of 60 meters, but generally oscillates around values of 30 meters.

Age
Until 2018 no absolute ages had been determined, but the formation was most commonly assigned to a late Carnian to early Norian age on paleontological grounds. However, Rhaetian or even Early Jurassic age of this unit was also advocated in the literature. A U-Pb (Uranium decay) dating found that the Caturrita Formation dated around 225.42 million years ago, putting it less than 10 million years younger than the Santa Maria and Ischigualasto Formations, from where the earliest dinosaurs are known.

Geographical occurrence

Outcrops of the Caturrita Formation are found in the Brazilian state of Rio Grande do Sul. From the town of Taquari they follow for 250 kilometers a thin band in the central part of the state in an east-westerly fashion right up to Mata.

Depositional environment
The sediments of the Caturrita Formation belong to the upper section of the Santa Maria Supersequence. In terms of sequence stratigraphy they are equivalent to a highstand systems tract. The scarlet, ephemeral, mainly clayey fluvio-lacustrine deposits of the Alemoa Member gradually cede to more sandy, occasionally gravelly deposits of a braided river-system that was operational all-year-round. These deposits of the Caturrita Formation settled out in an alluvial flood-plain. The changeover in sedimentary facies was accompanied by a climatic change to more humid conditions.

The sediments are of continental nature (red beds) and form massive sandstone and siltstone bodies.

Vertebrate fauna
The Caturrita Formation contains a biozone for tetrapods, the so-called “Ictidosauria Assemblage Zone″ Ca-1.Ictidosaurs are tritheledontid cynodonts, a sister group of the mammals. This is the reason, why this biozone recently has been renamed as “Mammaliamorpha Cenozone” to underline the importance of the cynodont fossils. The Caturrita Formation also hosts the stratigraphic marker level “Jachaleria” named after the dicynodont Jachaleria candelariensis. Dinosaurs and other vertebrates have been discovered as well.

In 1998 tracks of prosauropods have been found near Faxinal do Soturno that were most likely caused by Unaysaurus tolentinoi.

The fossil finds are concentrated around three major areas:
Santa Maria and northern surroundings (Água Negra)
Faxinal do Soturno
Candelária and surroundings (Linha São Luis)

The following taxa have been discovered so far in the Caturrita Formation:

Synapsids

Dinosaurs 

Unnamed prosauropod genus present in Rio Grande do Sul, Brazil.

Other tetrapods
Undetermined phytosaur genus.

See also 

 Santa Maria Formation
 List of dinosaur-bearing rock formations
 Laguna Colorada Formation
 Elliot Formation

References

Bibliography 
 Weishampel, David B.; Dodson, Peter; and Osmólska, Halszka (eds.): The Dinosauria, 2nd, Berkeley: University of California Press. 861 pp. .

Further reading 
 J. F. Bonaparte, J. Ferigolo, and A. M. Ribeiro. 1999. A new early Late Triassic saurischian dinosaur from Rio Grande do Sol state, Brazil. In Y. Tomida, T. H. Rich, and P. Vickers-Rich (eds.), Proceedings of the Second Gondwanan Dinosaur Symposium, National Science Museum Monographs 15:89-109
 G. Brea, J. F. Bonaparte, C. L. Schultz and A. G. Martinelli. 2005. A new specimen of Guaibasaurus candelariensis (basal Saurischia) from the Late Triassic Caturrita Formation of southern Brazil. In A. W. A. Kellner, D. D. R. Henriques, and T. Rodrigues (eds.), II Congresso Latino-Americano de Paleontologia de Vertebrados, Boletim de Resumos. Museum Nacional/UFRJ, Rio de Janeiro 55-56
 R. Costa, I. d. S. Carvalho, and C. Schwanke. 2003. Icnofósseis de vertebrados na Formação Caturrita (Neotriássico da Bacia do Paraná) no Estado do Rio Grande do Sul, Brasil [Vertebrate ichnofossils from the Caturrita Formation (Late Triassic of the Paraná Basin) in Rio Grande do Sul State, Brazil]. XVIII Congresso Brasileiro de Paleontologia: A Paleontologia e Suas Aplicações, 13–18 July 2003. Sociedade Brasileira de Paleontologia, Universidade de Brasília. Boletim de Resumos 110-111
 E.-E. Kischlat and M. C. Barbarena. 1999. Triassic Brazilian dinosaurs: new data. I Simpósio Brasileiro de Paleontologia de Vertebrados. Paleontologia em Destaque 26:56
 M. C. Langer and J. Ferigolo. 2005. The first ornithischian body-fossils in Brazil: Late Triassic (Caturrita Formation) of Rio Grande do Sul. In A. W. A. Kellner, D. D. R. Henriques, and T. Rodrigues (eds.), II Congresso Latino-Americano de Paleontologia de Vertebrados, Boletim de Resumos. Museum Nacional/UFRJ, Rio de Janeiro 146-147
 A. G. Martinelli, J. F. Bonaparte, C. L. Schultz and R. Rubert. 2005. A new tritheledontid (Therapsida, Eucynodontia) from the Late Triassic of Rio Grande do Sul (Brazil) and its phylogenetic relationships among carnivorous non-mammalian eucynodonts. Ameghiniana 42(1):191-208
 R. T. Müller, A. A. S. da Rosa, L. R. Silva, A. S. S. Aires, C. P. Pacheco, A. E. B. Pavanatto, and S. Dias-da-Silva. 2015. Wachholz, a new exquisite dinosaur-bearing fossiliferous site from the Upper Triassic of southern Brazil. Journal of South American Earth Sciences 61:120-128
 R. C. da Silva, R. Barboni, T. Dutra, M. M. Godoy, and R. B. Binotto. 2012. Footprints of large theropod dinosaurs and implications on the age of Triassic biotas from Southern Brazil. Journal of South American Earth Sciences
 M. B. Soares, C. L. Schultz, and B. I. D. Horn. 2011. New information on Riograndia guaibensis Bonaparte, Ferigolo & Ribeiro, 2001 (Eucynodontia, Tritheledontidae) from the Late Triassic of southern Brazil: anatomical and biostratigraphic implications. Anais da Academia Brasileira de Ciências 83(1):329-354

Geologic formations of Brazil
Geography of Rio Grande do Sul
Triassic Brazil
Triassic System of South America
Norian Stage
Sandstone formations
Siltstone formations
Mudstone formations
Conglomerate formations
Fluvial deposits
Fossiliferous stratigraphic units of South America
Paleontology in Brazil
Formations